The Treaty of Jaffa, more seldom referred to as the Treaty of Ramla or the treaty of 1192, was a truce agreed to during the Crusades. It was signed on 1 or 2 September 1192 A.D. (20th of Sha'ban 588 AH) between the Muslim ruler Saladin and Richard the Lionheart, King of England, shortly after the July–August 1192 Battle of Jaffa. The treaty, negotiated with the help of Balian of Ibelin, guaranteed a three-year truce between the two armies. This treaty ended the Third Crusade.

Provisions
The treaty mainly addressed two main issues: the status of Jerusalem and pilgrimage rights for Christians, and the extent of sovereignty of the Crusader state in the Holy Land. In the first regard, the treaty guaranteed safe passage of Christians and Muslims through Palestine, stating that Jerusalem would remain under Islamic control, while it would be open to Christian pilgrimages. In the second issue, it stated that the Christians would hold the coast from Tyre to Jaffa, practically reducing the Latin kingdom, which had lost almost all of its territory in 1187, to a geopolitical coastal strip that extended between these two cities. Ascalon's fortifications were to be demolished and the town returned to Saladin.

Neither Saladin nor King Richard were fond of the overall accord, but had little other choice. The Islamic ruler had been weakened by the trials and expense of war and both had to deal with threats to his kingdom at home. Richard left Acre on 9 October 1192.

Attempted treaties
After the Siege of Acre, King Richard and Saladin had a series of conversations about concluding the Third Crusade. These letters usually contained arguments about religious ownership and who had the right to  ownership of Jerusalem. None of these attempts actually resulted in an actual truce. This, of course, was until the Treaty of Jaffa was created due to King Richard Lionheart's need to return to his country, which was inevitably falling apart with his absence.

Distinction from 1229 treaty
In 1229 a somewhat similar double treaty was signed, one in Tell el-Ajjul and one in Jaffa, which together brought to an end  the Sixth Crusade. The treaties of Tell Ajjul and Jaffa settled the territorial disputes between the competing Ayyubid rulers of Egypt, Syria and various smaller principalities, allowing to Sultan Al-Kamil of Egypt to close a diplomatic deal with the leader of the Sixth Crusade, Emperor Frederick II.

See also
List of treaties

References

Bibliography
 Richard, Jean. The Crusades, p. 328.
 Tyerman, Christopher. The Crusades. pp. 461, 471
 Riley-Smith, Jonathan. The Crusades, p. 146
 Axelrod, Alan and Charles L. Phillips, editors.  "Encyclopedia of Historical Treaties and Alliances, Vol. 1".  Zenda Inc., New York, 2001.  .

Third Crusade
Treaties of the Kingdom of Jerusalem
Richard I of England
12th-century treaties
1192
Jaffa
Saladin